Democracy and Development occurs in the names of many African organisations and political parties:

Alliance for Democracy and Development (Benin)
Alliance for Democracy and Development (Cameroon)
Alliance for Democracy and Development (Zambia)
Centre for Democracy and Development
Forum for Democracy and Development in Zambia
Gabonese Union for Democracy and Development in Gabon
National Alliance for Democracy and Development in Gambia
National Council for Democracy and Development in Guinea
National Union for Democracy and Development in Burkina Faso
New Alliance for Democracy and Development in Burundi
Rally for Democracy and Development in the Republic of the Congo
Rally for the Support of Democracy and Development in Togo
Union for Democracy and Development (Mali)
Union of Forces for Democracy and Development

Democracy and Development is also the title of a book by Adam Przeworski

See also
Movement for Democracy and Development (disambiguation)